Magnus Gullerud (born 13 November 1991) is a Norwegian handball player for Kolstad Håndball and the Norwegian national team.

He participated at the 2019 World Men's Handball Championship.

He started out playing handball for Skarnes Håndball and later signed with Elverum Håndball as an amateur player. In 2009, Magnus Gullerud signed a professional contract with Elverum Håndball.

References

External links

1991 births
Living people
Norwegian male handball players
Sportspeople from Kongsvinger
SønderjyskE Håndbold players
Expatriate handball players
Handball-Bundesliga players
SC Magdeburg players
Kolstad Håndball players
Norwegian expatriate sportspeople in Denmark
Norwegian expatriate sportspeople in Germany
Handball players at the 2020 Summer Olympics
Olympic handball players of Norway